Cindy Hahamovitch is an American historian, and the B. Phinizy Spalding Distinguished Professor of Southern History at the University of Georgia.
She has won a Merle Curti Award, a Philip Taft Labor History Book Award and a James A. Rawley Prize (OAH).

Life
She was born in Montreal, Quebec. She graduated from Rollins College and the University of North Carolina, Chapel Hill, where she studied with Leon Fink.
She taught at the College of William & Mary., and currently teaches at University of Georgia.
She is an Organization of American Historians Distinguished Lecturer.

Works
 The Fruits of Their Labor: Atlantic Coast Farmworkers and the Making of Migrant Poverty, 1870-1945. Chapel Hill, NC: University of North Carolina Press, 1997. , 
 No Man’s Land: Jamaican Guestworkers in America and the Global History of Deportable Labor. Princeton: Princeton University Press, 2011. ,

References

Living people
Labor historians
Merle Curti Award winners
University of Georgia faculty
College of William & Mary faculty
University of North Carolina at Chapel Hill alumni
Writers from Montreal
American women historians
20th-century American historians
20th-century American women writers
21st-century American historians
21st-century American women writers
1962 births
Presidents of the Labor and Working-Class History Association